The 2021 European Archery Championships were held from 31 May to 6 June in Antalya, Turkey.

Medal table

Medal summary

Recurve

Compound

Participating nations
40 countries participated in this competition.

 (9)
 (5)
 (6)
 (6)
 (4)
 (6)
 (4)
 (11)
 (11)
 (9)
 (6)
 (12)
 (12)
 (3)
 (9)
 (2)
 (1)
 (3)
 (6)
 (12)
 (2)
 (1)
 (6)
 (5) 
 (5)
 (1)
 (11)
 (2)
 (12)
 (10)
 (6)
 (12)
 (4)
 (9)
 (7)
 (12)
 (7)
 (10)
 (12)
 (8)

References

External links
Results book

European Archery Championships
2021 in archery
2021 in Turkish sport
International archery competitions hosted by Turkey
Archery competitions in Turkey
European Archery Championships
European Archery Championships
Sport in Antalya
2021 in European sport